The 2002 Japanese Grand Prix (formally the 2002 Fuji Television Japanese Grand Prix) was a Formula One motor race held at Suzuka on 13 October 2002. It was the seventeenth and final race of the 2002 FIA Formula One World Championship. It is also the last race held on this layout.

The 53-lap race was won by Michael Schumacher, driving a Ferrari. Schumacher took pole position, led the whole race except during the pit stops, and set the fastest race lap. Teammate Rubens Barrichello finished second, with Kimi Räikkönen third in a McLaren-Mercedes.

This was the last race for  runner-up Eddie Irvine and Mika Salo, who had been in F1 since 1993 and 1994 respectively. It was also the last race for Alex Yoong and Allan McNish, though the latter could not participate in the race itself due to injuries suffered in a heavy crash during qualifying.

Background
With both drivers and constructors title already decided, the fight in the championships concentrated on the lower ranks. In the Drivers' Championship, Juan Pablo Montoya was 3rd, 5 points ahead of teammate Ralf Schumacher. For Ralf to take 3rd, he needed to either win the race, provided that Montoya finished lower than second, or to finish second with Montoya out of the point-scoring positions. David Coulthard had a slim chance of winning 3rd place but that could only happen if he won the Japanese Grand Prix with Montoya finishing 3rd or lower. Coulthard could take 4th in the Championship by finishing 4th and ahead of Ralf Schumacher. Further down, a number of drivers had a chance to improve their final ranking.

In the Constructors' Championship, Ferrari, Williams and McLaren had secured 1st to 3rd. Renault had almost clinched 4th as Sauber would needed at least to win the race with their second car finishing in the points to take 4th. Four points separated four teams (Sauber on 11, Jaguar with 8 and both Honda runners BAR and Jordan with 7 points each) in a tough fight for positions, as the final ranking influenced how much a team received from the revenue of TV rights.

Ferrari were expected to dominate this race. If Michael Schumacher managed to win the race, he would improve his record number of wins with a perfect finishing record, as Schumacher had not retired from any race that year and had finished every race on the podium. This was the first Formula 1 race for Toyota at their home country of Japan.

A number of teams were testing the previous week before the Grand Prix. McLaren, Williams, Toyota and BAR were at Barcelona and McLaren test driver Alexander Wurz broke the lap record there. Ferrari were testing at Mugello with Sauber and at Jerez and Fiorano while Renault and Jordan tested at Silverstone. The teams concentrated on set-up for the Grand Prix as well as testing components for the 2003 season.

Qualifying
Michael Schumacher grabbed his 7th pole position of the season and the 50th of his career ahead of teammate Rubens Barrichello and David Coulthard. Kimi Räikkönen was 4th ahead of Ralf Schumacher and Juan Pablo Montoya. Takuma Sato managed 7th and his best ever qualifying ahead of his teammate Giancarlo Fisichella. Jacques Villeneuve was 9th with Jenson Button wrapping up the top 10.

The session was interrupted for over 75 minutes after Allan McNish appeared to have lost control of his car and crashed backwards through the safety barrier at the 130R curve. The back of his car was destroyed, luckily though he didn't sustain any major injuries. He qualified in 18th, however was unfit to start the race.

The fight for pole turned to be a no-contest with Michael Schumacher convincingly faster than anyone else here including his teammate. The fight at the front was really between the other 5 drivers of the top 3 teams. For most of the session they appeared to be evenly matched however Barrichello, Coulthard and Räikkönen all managed to improve late in the session while Ralf Schumacher and Juan Pablo Montoya didn't and hence the final order.

Behind the top 3 teams, the Jordan team took the honours of the best of the rest thanks to a more powerful Honda engine. Takuma Sato impressed his home crowds by not just outqualifying his teammate but also ending up in 7th and only 1.773 seconds off Michael's pace despite this being his first time on the track in a Formula 1 car. Behind Sato, it was close as expected with 1 second separating Sato in 7th and Massa in 15th.

In addition to McNish's crash, Olivier Panis and Eddie Irvine suffered from car problems and had to stop on the track. Panis managed to get back and use the spare but Irvine didn't.

In the battle of the teammates, Mika Salo managed to qualify 1.449 seconds ahead of Allan McNish although McNish had his crash and only had 1 run. Jacques Villeneuve managed to qualify 0.843 seconds ahead of Olivier Panis but again Panis had car problems and had to switch to the spare and Michael Schumacher managed to out-qualify Rubens Barrichello by 0.432 seconds.
Closest were Ralf Schumacher and Juan Pablo Montoya with just 0.063 seconds separating them. David Coulthard managed to be 0.109 seconds ahead of Kimi Räikkönen and Jenson Button was 0.118 seconds ahead of Jarno Trulli who also suffered a car problem on his final run.

Takuma Sato had his best qualifying position the season while Michael Schumacher once again equalled his best. Both Ralf Schumacher and Juan Pablo Montoya equalled their worst qualifying positions this season.

Qualifying classification

Race

Race classification

Notes 
 This was the last race that the F1 Digital+ channel showed live.

Championship standings after the race 
Bold text indicates the World Champions.

Drivers' Championship standings

Constructors' Championship standings

References

Japanese Grand Prix
Japanese Grand Prix
Grand Prix
Japanese Grand Prix